The  is a handheld game console produced by Nintendo. It was announced in March 2010 and unveiled at E3 2010 as the successor to the Nintendo DS. The system features backward compatibility with Nintendo DS video games. As an eighth-generation console, its primary competitor was Sony's PlayStation Vita.

The handheld's most prominent feature is its ability to display stereoscopic 3D effects without the use of 3D glasses or additional accessories, and it offers new features such as the StreetPass and SpotPass tag modes, powered by Nintendo Network; augmented reality using its 3D cameras; and Virtual Console, which allows owners to download and play games originally released on older video game systems.

The Nintendo 3DS was released in Japan on February 26, 2011, and worldwide beginning in March 2011. Less than six months later on July 28, 2011, Nintendo announced a significant price reduction from US$249.99 to US$169.99 amid disappointing launch sales. The company offered ten free NES games and ten free Game Boy Advance games from the Nintendo eShop to consumers who bought the system at the original launch price. This strategy was considered a major success, and the console went on to become one of Nintendo's most successful handheld consoles in the first two years of its release. , the Nintendo 3DS family of systems combined have sold 75.94 million units, and games for the systems have sold 388.89 million units as of September 30, 2022.

The 3DS had multiple variants over the course of its life. The Nintendo 3DS XL, a larger model featuring a 90% larger screen, was first released in Japan and Europe in July 2012. In August 2012, it launched in the US for $199.99. An "entry-level" version of the console, the Nintendo 2DS, with a fixed "slate" form factor and lacking autostereoscopic (3D) functionality, was released in Western markets in October 2013. The New Nintendo 3DS features a more powerful CPU, a second analog stick called the C-Stick, additional buttons, an improved camera, and other changes, and was first released in Japan in October 2014.

3DS family hardware was officially discontinued on September 16, 2020. Nintendo Network services remain active in most regions; the Nintendo eShop is slated to shut down on March 27, 2023. The option to add credits for the 3DS has been removed as of late August 2022.

History

Background 
Nintendo began experimenting with stereoscopic 3D video game technology in the 1980s. The Famicom 3D System, an accessory consisting of liquid crystal shutter glasses, was Nintendo's first product that enabled stereoscopic 3D effects. Although very few titles were released, Nintendo helped design one—called Famicom Grand Prix II: 3D Hot Rally—which was co-developed by Nintendo and HAL Laboratory and released in 1988. The Famicom 3D System failed to garner market interest and was never released outside Japan.

Nintendo's second attempt with 3D development was the Virtual Boy, designed by Gunpei Yokoi, creator of the Game Boy handheld console and popular Metroid video game. It was a portable table-top system consisting of goggles and a controller that used a spinning disc to achieve full stereoscopic monochrome 3D. Released in 1995, the Virtual Boy sold fewer than a million units, with only 22 compatible game titles released, and was widely considered to be a commercial failure. Shigeru Miyamoto, known for his work on popular game franchises such as Mario and The Legend of Zelda, commented in a 2011 interview that he felt conflicted about Yokoi's decision to use wire-frame models for 3D and suggested that the product may not have been marketed correctly. The failure of the Virtual Boy left many at Nintendo doubting the viability of 3D gaming.

Despite this, Nintendo continued to investigate the incorporation of 3D technology into later products. The GameCube, released in 2001, was also capable of displaying true stereoscopic 3D with an LCD attachment, though only the launch title Luigi's Mansion was ever designed to utilize it. While a working internal prototype was created, the add-on itself was never released due to its expensive cost, leaving the feature unavailable outside of development. Nintendo later experimented with a 3D LCD during the development of the Game Boy Advance SP, but the idea was shelved after it failed to achieve satisfactory results. Another attempt was made in preparation for a virtual navigation guide to be used on the Nintendo DS at Shigureden, an interactive museum in Japan. Nintendo president Hiroshi Yamauchi encouraged additional 3D research in an effort to use the technology in the exhibition. Although the project fell short, Nintendo was able to collect valuable research on liquid crystal which would later aid in the development of the Nintendo 3DS.

Development 
Speculation on the development of a successor to the Nintendo DS began in late 2009. At the time, Nintendo controlled as much as 68.3% of the handheld gaming market. In October 2009, tech tabloid Bright Side of News reported that Nvidia, a graphics processing unit (GPU) developer that recently made headway with its Tegra System-on-Chip processors, had been selected by Nintendo to develop hardware for their next generation portable game console. Later that month, speaking about the future for Nintendo's portable consoles, company president Satoru Iwata mentioned that while mobile broadband connectivity via subscription "doesn't fit Nintendo customers", he was interested in exploring options like Amazon's Whispernet found on the Amazon Kindle which provides free wireless connectivity to its customers for the sole purpose of browsing and purchasing content from the Kindle Store.

Nintendo had expressed interest in motion-sensing capabilities since the development of the original Nintendo DS, and an alleged comment by Satoru Iwata from a 2010 interview with Asahi Shimbun implied that the successor to the Nintendo DS would incorporate a motion sensor. The claim led to a minor dispute between the publication and Nintendo over its accuracy. In February 2010, video gaming website Computer and Video Games reported that a select "handful" of Japanese developers were in possession of software development kits for the Nintendo DS successor, with The Pokémon Company given special priority. According to their insider at an unspecified third-party development studio, the hardware features a "tilt" function that is similar to that of the iPhone, "but does a lot more".

Announcement 

On March 23, 2010, Nintendo officially announced the Nintendo 3DS handheld console. According to industry analysts, the timing of the announcement, which had drawn attention away from the launch of the company's still-new Nintendo DSi XL handheld, was likely intended to preempt impending news leaks about the product by the Japanese press. In April 2010, a picture of a possible development build of the internal components of the 3DS was released as part of a U.S. Federal Communications Commission (FCC) filing by Mitsumi. An analysis of the image showed that it was likely genuine as it featured components known to be used in the Nintendo DS line along with features of the 3DS that had not been announced like a 5:3 top screen and a control nub similar to those used in Sony's PlayStation Portable systems.

In June 2010, video gaming website IGN reported that according to "several developers who have experienced 3DS in its current form," the system possesses processing power that "far exceed[s] the Nintendo Wii" and with 3D shaders, they could make games that "look close to current generation visuals on the Xbox 360 and PlayStation 3". IGN also cited "several developer sources" as saying that the system does not use the Nvidia Tegra mobile chipset.

The system was fully revealed at Nintendo's conference at E3 2010 on June 15, 2010. The first game revealed was Kid Icarus: Uprising, and several other titles from third parties were also announced, including Square Enix with Kingdom Hearts 3D, Konami with Metal Gear Solid: Snake Eater 3D, Ubisoft with Assassin's Creed: Lost Legacy, and Capcom with Resident Evil: Revelations and Super Street Fighter IV: 3D Edition. Other Nintendo-developed titles revealed after the conference included Mario Kart 7, Animal Crossing: New Leaf, Star Fox 64 3D and The Legend of Zelda: Ocarina of Time 3D. Nintendo also demoed 3D trailers for DreamWorks' How to Train Your Dragon, Warner Bros' Legend of the Guardians: The Owls of Ga'Hoole, and Disney's film Tangled on the 3DS. The 3DS design shown at E3 was almost final, but subject to minor changes.

On September 29, 2010, Nintendo announced that the Nintendo 3DS would be released in Japan on February 26, 2011. Furthermore, several additional features were announced: the inclusion of a Mii Maker (similar to the Mii Channel on the Wii), Virtual Console (including Game Boy and Game Boy Color), 3D Classics, a cradle for recharging the system's battery, multitasking, several included augmented reality games, an included 2 GB SD card, and stored game data, as well as the final names for the 3DS tag modes, StreetPass and SpotPass collectively. Nintendo further revealed that the system would be available at launch in two colors, "Aqua Blue" and "Cosmos Black", and that its launch price in Japan would be ¥25,000. The final physical design was also revealed at this event.

Pre-launch events 
On January 19, 2011, Nintendo held two simultaneous press conferences in Amsterdam and New York City, where it revealed all of the features of the Nintendo 3DS. In North America, the release date was confirmed as March 27, 2011, with a retail price of $249.99. In Europe, the release date was announced as March 25, 2011, though Nintendo said that pricing would be up to retailers. Most retailers priced the handheld between £219.99 and £229.99, though some retailers, such as Amazon, lowered the price following Sony's announcement of the PSP's successor on January 26, 2011, with some retailers pricing the handheld at around £200 in February.

In February 2011, Nintendo held four hands-on events in the UK named "Believe Your Eyes". February 5 and 6 saw simultaneous events in London and Manchester, while the 12th and 13th saw events in Glasgow and Bristol. Invitations to the events were offered first to Club Nintendo members, then later to members of the public via an online registration form. Guests watched two brief performances and trailers, then were given time to play a selection of games on 3DS devices. Attendees were then allowed into a second room, containing further games to play (mainly augmented reality-based) and in-device videos.

Launch 
The Nintendo 3DS launched in Japan on February 26, 2011, priced at ¥25,000. On March 25, 2011, the system launched in Europe, with pricing set by individual retailers. On March 27, 2011, the Nintendo 3DS launched in North America, priced at US$249.99. On March 31, 2011, the system launched in Australia and New Zealand, priced at A$349.95. The system was originally launched in all regions in both Aqua Blue and Cosmo Black color variations.

On July 28, 2011, Nintendo announced the Nintendo 3DS would be getting a price cut of almost a third of the console's original price, from $249.99 to $169.99 in North America, 25,000 ¥ to 15,000 ¥ in Japan, and $349.95 to $249.95 in Australia. Although in Europe, pricing is up to retailers, the system also received a substantial price cut. In an effort to compensate those who had paid the original price, the company introduced the Nintendo 3DS Ambassador Program, through which existing 3DS owners were eligible (conditional that they must have accessed the Nintendo eShop at least once prior to August 21) to download ten NES games and ten Game Boy Advance games at no extra cost. Nintendo further stated that the NES Ambassador titles would see future release to the general public on the Nintendo eShop, while there were no plans to make the Game Boy Advance Ambassador titles available. The ten NES games were released in North America on August 31 and in Europe on September 1, 2011. These include: Balloon Fight, Donkey Kong Jr., Ice Climber, Metroid, NES Open Tournament Golf, Super Mario Bros., The Legend of Zelda, Wrecking Crew, Yoshi (North America) / Mario & Yoshi (Europe & Australia), and Zelda II: The Adventure of Link. The ten Game Boy Advance games were released in North America on December 16, 2011. These include: F-Zero: Maximum Velocity, Fire Emblem: The Sacred Stones, Kirby & the Amazing Mirror, Mario Kart: Super Circuit, Mario vs. Donkey Kong, Metroid Fusion, Super Mario Advance 3: Yoshi's Island, The Legend of Zelda: The Minish Cap, Wario Land 4, and WarioWare, Inc.: Mega Microgames!

On April 28, 2012, the Nintendo 3DS launched in South Korea, in Cosmos Black, Misty Pink, and Cobalt Blue color variations. On September 28, 2012, the system launched in two other regions, Hong Kong and Taiwan, in Cerulean Blue and Shimmer Pink.

Larger model 

Rumors of a larger model of the Nintendo 3DS being in production appeared during June 2012, when Japanese publication Nikkei wrote an article stating that the system was initially scheduled to be unveiled at E3 2012. However, Nintendo responded that these rumors were false and that the article was "entire speculation", but refrained from further commenting on the subject. Finally, on June 21, 2012, the system was announced during a Nintendo Direct presentation. Featuring 90% larger screens than the original Nintendo 3DS, the system was set to launch on all major regions during the middle of the year.

The Nintendo 3DS XL (Nintendo 3DS LL in Japan) was released on July 28, 2012, in Japan, priced at ¥18,900, and was available in Silver + Black, Red + Black and White color variations. In Europe, the system launched on the same day but in Silver + Black, Blue + Black and Red + Black color variations. On August 19, the Nintendo 3DS XL launched in North America, priced at US$199.99, and available in Blue + Black and Red + Black. On August 23, 2012, Australia and New Zealand saw the launch of the new handheld, priced at AU$249.95, and available in the same color variations as in Europe, Silver + Black, Blue + Black and Red + Black. The launch of the Nintendo 3DS XL coincided with the release of New Super Mario Bros. 2, the first Nintendo 3DS game to be available in both retail and downloadable versions.

On September 20, 2012, the Nintendo 3DS XL launched in South Korea, in Silver + Black, Red + Black, and White color variations. On September 28, 2012, the system launched in two other regions, Hong Kong and Taiwan, in Blue + Black and White color variations. In December 2012, Nintendo Chinese distribution partner, iQue, launched the iQue 3DS XL in three special editions, one featuring a Mario decal while the other two feature both Mario and Luigi.

Later years 
Nintendo officially announced their next console, the Nintendo Switch, in October 2016 and with worldwide release in March 2017. The Switch is a hybrid video game console that can be used both as a home console docked to a television or taken on-the-go to be used as a handheld system. While the Switch displaced the Wii U as Nintendo's primary home console in terms of production and distribution, Nintendo executives affirmed that the company would continue to support the 3DS with more first-party and third-party games in the immediate future. Fils-Aimé assured that the 3DS "has a long life in front of it", and that Nintendo intends for it to co-exist with the Switch, while Kimishima considered the 3DS as an entry-level product for younger players. In June 2017, Fils-Aimé said they would be supporting Nintendo 3DS beyond 2018. In July 2017, production of the New Nintendo 3DS had ended in Europe and Japan leaving the New Nintendo 3DS XL and then-recently released New Nintendo 2DS XL as the only 3DS models still in production worldwide. In June 2018, Nintendo said it was considering some possibilities for a successor to the Nintendo 3DS.

In June 2019, Nintendo confirmed that first-party game development had ceased, but that the system would continue to be supported through the near future. With the unveiling of the Nintendo Switch Lite—a lower-end version of the Switch console—Nintendo of America CEO Doug Bowser stated that the company still planned to continue supporting the 3DS family as long as there was still demand. In November 2019, Bowser reaffirmed that Nintendo would continue to support the 3DS into 2020. On September 16, 2020, Nintendo confirmed that production of the Nintendo 3DS family of systems had ended. On July 20, 2021, Nintendo's Japanese website announced that the Nintendo 3DS and Wii U eShops would no longer accept credit cards. This change was put in place on January 18, 2022. The Internet Browser's filter function was also no longer able to be turned off for Japanese 3DS devices after this date. The ability to purchase content through the Nintendo eShop will be discontinued on March 27, 2023.

Hardware 

The original Nintendo 3DS model has custom components co-developed by the Nintendo Research & Engineering department and other manufacturers, all combined into a unified system on chip. One processor core is dedicated to games and applications, while the other core is exclusive to the operating system, enabling multitasking and background tasks. These tasks are handled seamlessly in the background during gameplay or while the system is in sleep mode. The system also contains a single-core ARM9-based processor, enabling backward compatibility with both Nintendo DS and DSi titles.

The console contains two separate screens. On the original 3DS, the screen measures , while on the 3DS XL it measures . It is autostereoscopic; it uses a parallax barrier to produce a three-dimensional effect without requiring special glasses. There is a 3D Depth Slider next to the screen for adjusting the 3D effect or turning it off altogether. The bottom screen is a 4:3 resistive touchscreen with a display resolution of 320×240 pixels (QVGA). On the original Nintendo 3DS, the screen measures , while on the 3DS XL it measures .

The system features three camera sensors: two cameras on the outside of the device, capable of taking 3D photos and capturing 3D video; and one camera facing the user positioned above the top screen. All camera sensors have a maximum resolution of 640×480 pixels (0.3 megapixels, VGA) with one-point focus and can only achieve digital zoom. There is also a microphone in the bottom of the system.

The system includes  of eMMC flash memory manufactured by either Toshiba or Samsung. The system's memory can be expanded via an SD memory card slot, which supports SD and SDHC memory cards. All the Nintendo 3DS systems come packaged with a 2 GB SD card while Nintendo 3DS XL systems include a  SDHC card. The system uses 2.4 GHz 802.11 b/g wireless network connectivity with enhanced WPA2 security. There is also an infrared port on the back of the console, which allows the system to connect with certain peripherals such as the Circle Pad Pro and the amiibo reader/writer.

The Nintendo 3DS comes with a    lithium ion battery. Its longevity fluctuates between 3 and 5 hours while playing Nintendo 3DS games and between 5 and 8 hours while playing Nintendo DS games, depending on brightness, volume and wireless settings. The Nintendo 3DS XL, however, comes with a 1750 mAh, 3.7 V lithium-ion battery capable of lasting between 3.5 and 6.5 hours playing 3DS games and 6 to 10 hours playing DS games.

All systems in the Nintendo 3DS family use the same AC adapter used with the Nintendo DSi and Nintendo DSi XL. In order to reduce production costs, certain console bundles, such as Japanese and European releases of the Nintendo 3DS XL and the New Nintendo 3DS, were not bundled with an AC adapter, requiring players to either use one from an older system they may own or purchase one separately. Along with plugging the adapter directly into the system, the standard Nintendo 3DS comes with a charging cradle, which players place their system in to charge. Charging cradles for the Nintendo 3DS XL and New Nintendo 3DS systems are sold separately from their respective systems, and there is no cradle for the Nintendo 2DS.

Input 
The Nintendo 3DS input controls include the following: a round nub analog input called the Circle Pad, a D-pad, four face buttons (A, B, X, Y), bumper buttons (L, R), a Home button, Start and Select buttons, and a Power button. It also features a dedicated volume slider and a wireless switch, which turns on or off wireless communications. The touchscreen can be interacted with either the user's finger or a stylus bundled with the handheld. There is also a six-axis motion sensor, which includes a 3-axis accelerometer and a 3-axis gyroscope. Through the Circle Pad Pro accessory the system has access to a second Circle Pad and trigger buttons (ZL, ZR).

Game card 
The Nintendo 3DS Game Card is a media format used to physically distribute video games for Nintendo 3DS systems. The 3DS Game Card is similar in design to the Nintendo DS Game Card, but includes a small tab on the top left of the card that prevents 3DS Game Cards from being inserted into a Nintendo DS. These Game Cards can hold up to either 1 GB, 2 GB or 4 GB of game data depending on the game, which is 2, 4, and 8 times more storage, respectively, than the biggest Nintendo DS Game Card's capacity (512 MB). Some sources claim that an 8 GB version could be produced should a game ever require it.

Accessories

Circle Pad Pro 

The Circle Pad Pro is an accessory/add-on which connects to a Nintendo 3DS system through infrared, adding support for a second Circle Pad, a substitute R button input (as the original one becomes difficult to reach), and an extra set of trigger buttons (ZL / ZR). The device was first released in Japan on December 10, 2011, coinciding with the release of Monster Hunter 3G in the region. It was subsequently released in Europe on January 27, 2012, in Australia on February 2, 2012, and in North America on February 7, 2012, coinciding with the release of Resident Evil: Revelations in those regions.

Images of the device first appeared in September 2011 in Famitsu. The first titles confirmed to compatible with the add-on were Monster Hunter 3G, Resident Evil: Revelations, Ace Combat 3D Cross Rumble (Japanese version only), Metal Gear Solid: Snake Eater 3D, Kingdom Hearts 3D: Dream Drop Distance, and Shin Sangoku Musou VS.

The Nintendo 3DS XL version of the device, called the Circle Pad Pro XL, was released in Japan on November 15, 2012, Europe on March 22, 2013, and North America on April 17, 2013.

The C-Stick and ZL / ZR buttons on the New Nintendo 3DS are backward compatible with Circle Pad Pro-compatible titles.

Stand 

This accessory came bundled exclusively with every retail copy of Kid Icarus: Uprising. The stand made the game, and other games with similar controls such as Liberation Maiden, easier to play for various users, as it helped free the tension of suspending the console with one hand since the other hand would be using the stylus on the touch screen for longer periods than usual.

NFC Reader/Writer 

This peripheral enables Amiibo support for the Nintendo 3DS, 3DS XL, and 2DS, a feature already built-in to New Nintendo 3DS systems. The accessory is powered by two AA batteries.

Other models 
The Nintendo 3DS family consists of six models. Apart from the regular-sized Nintendo 3DS, the Nintendo 3DS XL is a larger model of the console which was released on July 28, 2012, and features 90% larger screens than the original Nintendo 3DS. The Nintendo 2DS is a complete redesign of the handheld which was released on October 12, 2013, and is described as an "entry level" version of the 3DS. This console, while still capable of playing Nintendo DS and 3DS games, removes the 3D functionality and changes the form factor to a fixed, "slate" design. The New Nintendo 3DS, which also has an XL variant, adds additional controls and improved functionality, and is able to play certain games not compatible with the previous models. A cheaper alternative, the New Nintendo 2DS XL, incorporates some of the features from the New Nintendo 3DS with elements from the 2DS such as the lack of stereoscopic 3D functionality; it also shifts from the slate form factor of the original 2DS model to a clamshell design.

Nintendo 2DS 

The Nintendo 2DS (abbreviated to 2DS) was announced on August 28, 2013, as a new entry-level model of the Nintendo 3DS family. While its hardware and software are relatively similar to the Nintendo 3DS (and still offers compatibility with Nintendo DS and 3DS games), it lacks the 3DS's signature 3D screen, does not have internal stereo speakers (only using a mono speaker), and uses a slate-like form factor as opposed to the clamshell design used by its Nintendo DS and 3DS predecessors. The Nintendo 2DS was released in North America and Europe on October 12, 2013, coinciding with the launch of Pokémon X & Y and is being sold alongside the Nintendo 3DS and 3DS XL at a relatively lower price point.

As a cheaper model of the Nintendo 3DS family that plays both Nintendo DS and 3DS games, the Nintendo 2DS is seen as a market strategy to broaden the overall Nintendo handheld gaming market. As such, the 2DS is a handheld console targeted at a different audience than that of the regular Nintendo 3DS models, particularly younger users. Despite concerns from critics who felt that the company was trying to de-emphasize the 3D functionality by releasing the 2DS, Nintendo maintains that 3D is still part of their future plans.

New Nintendo 3DS 

The New Nintendo 3DS and New Nintendo 3DS XL (known as New Nintendo 3DS LL in Japan) are updated revisions of the 3DS and 3DS XL that were first unveiled during a Japanese Nintendo Direct presentation on August 29, 2014. The new models feature a more powerful processor, face tracking for improved 3D viewing angles, additional ZL/ZR shoulder buttons and a new "C-Stick" pointing stick that are comparable to and backward compatible with games that support the Circle Pad Pro, colored face buttons inspired by those of Super NES controllers, automatic brightness adjustment, microSD storage, larger batteries, and integrated near-field communications support for use with Amiibo products. The regular-sized New Nintendo 3DS also has slightly larger screens than the prior model, and a suite of interchangeable faceplates.

As with its predecessors, the New Nintendo 3DS is compatible with existing DS and 3DS titles. Some software titles, such as Xenoblade Chronicles 3D and Super NES games released for Virtual Console, are specifically optimized for the device and its upgraded processor and are incompatible with the earlier 3DS and 2DS models.

The systems were released in Japan on October 11, 2014, in Australia and New Zealand on November 21, 2014, and at retail in Europe and North America on February 13, 2015. Only the XL version was made available in North America at launch, though the smaller model was later released in a series of limited edition bundles.

New Nintendo 2DS XL 

On April 27, 2017, Nintendo unveiled the New Nintendo 2DS XL (known as New Nintendo 2DS LL in Japan), which was released in North America and Europe on July 28, 2017 and Japan on July 29, 2017. The system is a variation of the New Nintendo 3DS line, featuring the additional hardware features and software compatibility of the New Nintendo 3DS, albeit without the stereoscopic 3D functionality, updated micro SD card placement to make it easier to remove, an updated home button and cartridge cover similar to the Nintendo Switch, and a foldable form factor.

Software

Operating system 

The Home Menu is a graphical user interface similar to the Nintendo DSi Menu and Wii U Menu for Nintendo 3DS systems. It is used to launch software stored on Nintendo DS and Nintendo 3DS Game Cards, applications installed on a SD card, and DSiWare titles installed in the system's internal memory. Application icons are set in a customizable grid navigable on the lower screen. On the upper screen, a special 3D animated logo is displayed for each individual app, as well as system information such as wireless signal strength, date and time, and battery life. Using the Home button, users can suspend the current software that is running and bring up the Home Menu, allowing the user to launch certain multitasking applications, such as the Internet Browser and Miiverse.

Similarly to the Nintendo DSi, the menu has updateable firmware. On April 25, 2012, a system update brought the introduction of a folder system, which allows users to put applications inside folders. On June 20, 2013, a system update brought the introduction of the Save Data Backup feature, which allows the user to back up save data from downloadable Nintendo 3DS software and most Virtual Console games. An update was released on October 30, 2014, to enable players to download custom themes for the Home Menu, based on various Nintendo titles.

Camera 
Nintendo 3DS Camera is a built-in photo and video recorder with an integrated media gallery and photo editing functionality. The app uses the system's two front-facing cameras to take 3D photos, and the user-facing camera to take regular 2D photos. All photographs are taken at a resolution of 640 x 480 px (VGA), or 0.3 megapixels. The two perspectives of 3D photographs are stored into two separate files, with JPG and MPO extensions.

There are various options and filters available when taking photos or recording video. There is also a Low-Light option, which is useful when taking photos and recording video in low lighting conditions.

On December 7, 2011, a system update added the ability to record 3D video along special recording options, such as the ability to make stop motion animations. All recording modes only allow a single video to be up to 10 minutes long.

Sound 
Nintendo 3DS Sound is a built-in music player and sound recorder. Supported filename extensions include MP3 audio with .mp3 and AAC audio with .mp4, .m4a, or .3GP. Audio files can be played from an SD card, with visualizations displayed on the upper screen. Music can be played while the console is closed, using the system's headphone jack. A set of sound manipulation options are available, as well as several audio filters. Ten-second voice recordings can also be recorded and edited. These can then be shared throughout other applications such as Swapnote. There is also a StreetPass function built-into the app, where users exchange song data to make a compatibility chart between them.

Nintendo eShop 

Nintendo eShop is the Nintendo 3DS's online software distribution service. Launched in June 2011, the eShop provides downloadable retail and download-only Nintendo 3DS titles, Virtual Console titles, and various applications and videos. It also allows users to purchase downloadable content (DLC) and automatically download patches for both physical and downloadable games. All content obtained from Nintendo eShop is attached to a Nintendo Network ID but can only be used in one system. Background downloading is possible via SpotPass, while playing games or in sleep mode. Up to ten downloads can be queued at a time and their status can be checked on the Home Menu. The Nintendo eShop supports simple user software reviews. Users can submit a review with "stars" ranging from one to five, representing its quality in a crescent order, and categorize software by whether it is suitable for hardcore or more casual players. User reviews can only be submitted after using the software for at least one hour.

Certain Latin American and Caribbean countries, which feature a more limited eShop, had their systems closed in July 2020. Countries in the region with the full eShop and the rest of the world are currently unaffected until March 2023.

It was later announced on February 15, 2022, that support for Nintendo eShop for the Nintendo 3DS for the rest of the world would be discontinued in late March 2023 (this was confirmed to be March 27, 2023), with the ability to add credit cards ceasing by May 23, 2022, followed by the inability to add funds by August 29, 2022.

Miiverse 

Miiverse was an integrated social networking service, which allowed players to interact and share their gaming experiences through their personal Mii characters. It was originally launched on Wii U and was launched on the Nintendo 3DS on December 11, 2013, via a firmware update. Its functionality was similar to the Wii U version albeit without the private messaging feature, and required a Nintendo Network ID.

Miiverse allowed users to seamlessly share accomplishments, comments, hand written notes, and game screenshots with other players on various communities specific to their games and applications. It was possible to access Wii U communities on the Nintendo 3DS and vice versa. It was also possible to access Miiverse on any internet enabled smartphone, tablet and PC. The service was moderated through software filtering as well as a human resource team in order to ensure that the content shared by users was appropriate and that no spoilers were shared. It was also possible to post screenshots from certain games to social networking websites such as Twitter, Tumblr and/or Facebook via the Nintendo 3DS Image Share service.

On November 7, 2017, the Miiverse servers closed down for the 3DS and the Wii U.

Internet browser 
The Nintendo 3DS's internet browser was released via a firmware update on June 6, 2011, in North America and June 7, 2011, in Europe and Japan. It functions as a multitasking system application and can be used while another application is suspended in the background. The browser supports HTML, CSS, JavaScript and some HTML5 elements but does not support Flash, video or music. It can also download and show 3D images with the .mpo file extension and allows users to save images on an SD card. Additionally the browser supports JPEG and MPO image uploads from the system's photo gallery. The user can also choose between the Google and the Yahoo! search engines, and can also create bookmarks.

Video services 

Nintendo Video launched in Australia, Europe, and Japan on July 13, 2011, and in North America on July 21, 2011, along with a tutorial video. The service periodically updates its video content availability through SpotPass, automatically adding and deleting content from the console. Up to four videos can be available through the app at the same time. Nintendo Video content include: established series such as Oscar's Oasis and Shaun the Sheep (with fifteen exclusive episodes); original series such as Dinosaur Office and BearShark by CollegeHumor; short films; movie trailers; and sports videos by Redbull and BSkyB. The Nintendo Video app was discontinued in the Japanese, European and Oceania regions by April 2014, and in North America by July 2015. In North America at least, the "Nintendo Video" name continues to exist via a permanent Nintendo eShop category for all hosted videos that previously featured on the former app, as well as potential new content. The permanently hosted online "Nintendo Video" eShop videos can be viewed on-demand at any time without additional costs.

The Netflix streaming video service was released in North America on July 14, 2011. Netflix users are able to pause streaming video on the Nintendo 3DS and resume it on other Netflix-enabled devices. Only 2D content is available through the service. The Netflix app was discontinued on June 30, 2021. Nintendo announced on October 21, 2011, that Hulu Plus would be released on the Nintendo 3DS by the end of the year. On February 16, 2012, following the debut of Hulu on the Wii, Nintendo reiterated the announcement this time claiming it would be available on the 3DS sometime in 2012. Finally, on August 6, 2013, the Hulu application became available in Japan and on October 17, 2013, the Hulu Plus application was launched in North America, along with a one-week free trial. On November 29, 2013, the YouTube application was released for the Nintendo 3DS in Europe and North America. It was discontinued in August 2019.

The SpotPass TV service launched in Japan on June 19, 2011. The service was a joint service between Nippon TV and Fuji TV that brought free 3D video content to Nintendo 3DS users in Japan. Types of content included programming teaching the user how to do magic tricks, Japanese idol sumo wrestling, sports, and 3D dating, among others. The service was terminated on June 20, 2012, a year after its inception. A Eurosport app launched in Europe and Australia on December 15, 2011, and worked similarly to the Nintendo Video app. It featured weekly episodes of Watts Zap and other compilation videos containing Eurosport content. The service was terminated on December 31, 2012, a year after its inception.

Swapnote 

Swapnote (known as Nintendo Letter Box in Europe and Australia) is a messaging application for the Nintendo 3DS. Swapnote was released on December 21, 2011, in Japan and on December 22 in Europe, Australia and North America, via the Nintendo eShop. The application is free and is pre-installed on newer systems. It allows users to send hand-written/drawn messages to registered friends via SpotPass either or other users via StreetPass. The app also allows users to freely embed pictures and sounds into their messages.

On October 31, 2013, Nintendo abruptly suspended the Swapnote/Nintendo Letter Box SpotPass functionality after discovering minors were sharing Friend Codes with strangers who had exploited the messaging service to allegedly exchange pornographic imagery.

Mii Maker 
Mii Maker is a system application that allows users to create Mii characters through either a selection of facial and body features, such as the nose, mouth, eyes, hair, among other, or by taking a photo using the system's cameras and auto-generate a personal Mii. Mii characters can also be added and shared by reading special QR codes with one of the cameras. It is also possible to import Mii characters from a Wii or a Wii U system. However, Mii created on Nintendo 3DS systems cannot be exported back to a Wii due to the addition of character parts in Mii Maker not present on the Wii's Mii Channel. This restriction, however, is not applied when exporting a Mii from a Nintendo 3DS to a Wii U system.

Activity Log 
Activity Log is a system application that tracks a record of which games have been played and for how long. Additionally, it functions as a pedometer. The feature encourages walking every day with the system in order to earn Play Coins, at a maximum of 10 each day at a rate of one per 100 steps, to a total of 300 coins. Play Coins can then be used with compatible games and applications to acquire special content and a variety of other benefits.

Other network features 
Other network features of the Nintendo 3DS include the Nintendo Network, SpotPass and StreetPass. StreetPass Mii Plaza is a StreetPass application which comes pre-installed on every Nintendo 3DS system, while Nintendo Zone Viewer is a built-in application that detects and makes use of certified SpotPass hotspots. The service has since been discontinued.

Games 

Retail copies of games are supplied on proprietary cartridges called Nintendo 3DS Game Cards, which are packaged in keep cases with simple instructions. In Europe, the boxes have a triangle at the bottom corner of the paper sleeve-insert side. The triangle is color-coded to identify the region for which the title is intended and which manual languages are included. Unlike with previous Nintendo consoles, the complete software manual is only available digitally via the system's Home Menu. Software published by Nintendo and by some third parties come packaged with Club Nintendo points, which can be redeemed for special rewards. Retail and download-only games are also available for download in the Nintendo eShop. All Nintendo 3DS consoles are region locked (software purchased in a region can be only played on that region's hardware).

A total of 386.48 million Nintendo 3DS games have been sold worldwide , with 49 titles surpassing the million-unit mark. The most successful game, Mario Kart 7, has sold 18.94 million units worldwide.

Launch titles 
The Nintendo 3DS launched in Japan with 8 games, in North America with 12 games and in Europe with 14 games. An additional thirty games were announced for release during the system's "launch window", which includes the three months after the system's launch date.

Augmented reality 

AR Games is a compilation of several augmented reality mini-games and simple tools, which is pre-installed on every Nintendo 3DS, along with 6 paper cards that interact with certain games. Five of the six cards have a picture of a character on them, consisting of Mario, Link, Kirby, Pikmin, and Samus. The sixth one is a question mark box from the Super Mario Bros. series. Nintendo has also published downloadable versions of this card in larger sizes. By scanning the cards, real time graphics are augmented onto live footage. It is also possible to take 3D photos of Nintendo characters, using any to all 6 AR Cards, as well as their Miis.

Some AR cards are also compatible with other Nintendo 3DS games including Nintendogs + Cats, Kid Icarus: Uprising, Pokédex 3D Pro, Freakyforms: Your Creations, Alive!, and Tetris: Axis.

Face Raiders is another augmented reality application pre-installed on every Nintendo 3DS system. In order to start playing, the user must take pictures of peoples' faces. These faces then turn into enemies and attack the player, who must shoot them using the system's gyroscope. The background of the game is the rear camera's viewpoint. As people walk by in the background, the game takes their pictures from their faces, also adding them as enemies. It is also possible to collect faces from the system's image gallery, which is searched automatically for faces.

There are other Nintendo 3DS applications that similarly use the system's AR capabilities, such as Photos with Mario, Photos with Animal Crossing, Pokémon Dream Radar, and Spirit Camera: The Cursed Memoir.

Download Play 
Download Play allows users to play local multiplayer games with other Nintendo 3DS systems using only one Game Card. Players must have their systems within wireless range (up to approximately 65 feet) of each other for the guest system to download the necessary data from the host system. Download Play on Nintendo 3DS systems is also backward compatible, meaning that it is also available for Nintendo DS games. Unlike Download Play on Nintendo DS, game data is stored on the system's SD card once downloaded to the guest system, no longer requiring a re-download for a future game session. Nintendo 3DS games can only transfer a maximum of 32 MB of data to other systems while in download play. Other forms of local multiplayer modes require each player to own the software that is currently being used.

Backward compatibility 

In addition to its own software, the Nintendo 3DS is backward compatible with all Nintendo DS and Nintendo DSi software. Like the DSi and DSi XL, the Nintendo 3DS is incompatible with DS software that requires use of the Game Boy Advance port. Nintendo DS and DSi software cannot be played with 3D visuals on the 3DS. The original DS display resolutions are displayed in a scaled and stretched fashion due to the increased resolution of the 3DS's screens. If the user holds down the START or SELECT buttons upon launching Nintendo DS software, the emulated screens will be displayed in the Nintendo DS's native resolution, albeit smaller with black borders. On the Nintendo 3DS XL, this method yields a viewing size for DS games similar to their native sizes (due to the larger screen size of the XL), unlike on the original 3DS models, where the games appear to be shrunk.

Virtual Console 

The Virtual Console service allows Nintendo 3DS owners to download and play games originally released for the Game Boy, Game Boy Color, Game Gear, Nintendo Entertainment System, and exclusively for the New Nintendo 3DS models, Super Nintendo Entertainment System. Virtual Console games are distributed over broadband Internet via the Nintendo eShop, and are saved to a removable SD card. Once downloaded, Virtual Console games can be accessed from the Home Menu as individual apps. The service was launched on June 6 in North America and June 7, 2011, in Japan and Europe as part of a system update.

Nintendo and Sega also launched the 3D Classics series, a selection of enhanced retro games for the Nintendo 3DS featuring updated stereoscopic graphics.

Non-gaming uses 
The Louvre Museum in Paris contracted Nintendo to create a 3DS-based audiovisual visitor guide. Titled Nintendo 3DS Guide: Louvre, this guide contains over 30 hours of audio and over 1,000 photographs of artwork and the museum itself, including 3D views, and also provides navigation thanks to differential GPS transmitters installed within the museum. 3DS XLs pre-loaded with the guide are available for hire at the museum, and the software can also be purchased from the Nintendo eShop. Unlike most 3DS titles, the guide is not region locked.

Comparison

Reception 
The Nintendo 3DS hardware has received largely positive reviews. IGN called its hardware design a "natural evolution of the Nintendo DSi system." CNET praised the device's 3D effect, while IGN called it "impressively sharp and clean", and impressively superior to its predecessors, although it was noted that the 3D effect only worked if the system was held at the right distance and angle. A common complaint was the 3DS's battery life; Engadget reported to get 3 hours of battery life from the system, while IGN reported 2 to 4.5 hours of play.

The Nintendo 3DS XL was very well received at launch. Reviewers generally recommended the console to new buyers of the Nintendo 3DS family, although not so much to current owners of a Nintendo 3DS. Kotaku mentioned it as "possibly the best portable gaming device ever...[and] a well-designed machine..." and that "it plays great games" while The Verge called it "the best portable gaming buy around right now." The Nintendo 3DS XL improves upon the battery life of the original 3DS. Kotaku claimed that the Nintendo 3DS XL's battery "lasts a cross-country flight.". Sam Byford of The Verge noted that the larger top screen makes more obvious problems with aliasing and low-resolution textures. He did, however, say that the 3D felt more immersive: "Where the 3DS felt like peering through a peephole into another world, the XL is almost like stepping through a door." On the other hand, Destructoid said the 3D effect on the XL was more subtle than on its predecessor. The Verge spoke positively of the build quality and design choices, saying the console improved on the original. A Destructoid reviewer said the 3DS XL was easier to use than the regular Nintendo 3DS, mainly due to their large hands. The Verge noted lowered sound quality from the original, the result of smaller speakers. Both The Verge and Gizmodo complained of low-quality cameras.

Sales

Pre-launch 
Prior to its launch, Amazon UK announced that the Nintendo 3DS was their most pre-ordered video game system ever. Nintendo of America announced that the number of pre-orders were double the number of pre-orders for the Wii.

Launch 
The system launched in Japan on February 26, 2011, and sold its entire allotment of 400,000 Nintendo 3DS units during its release, amid reports of major queues outside retailers and pre-order sellouts. On March 25, 2011, the system launched in Europe, selling 303,000 units during its first two days of its release. In the UK 113,000 3DS units were sold during its opening weekend, making it Nintendo's most successful hardware launch in the country to this day. According to the NPD Group, Nintendo sold just under 500,000 Nintendo 3DS units during the month of March 2011 in the US, with 440,000 Nintendo 3DS units sold in its first week of release. As of March 31, 2011, the 3DS had sold 3.61 million units, short of the 4 million Nintendo projected. The Nintendo 3DS is also the fastest selling console in Australia, with 200,000 units sold through 37 weeks of availability.

Price cut 
Following the system's price cut of almost one third of its original price by the second quarter of 2011, sales saw an increase of more than 260 percent during the comparable 19-day time period in July. About 185,000 units were sold following a price cut on August 12. Nintendo sold more than 235,000 Nintendo 3DS systems in the United States in August, being the second best-selling dedicated game system for the month.

Approximately 8 months after its release, Nintendo of America announced that sales of the Nintendo 3DS had surpassed the original Nintendo DS in its first year, which was approximately 2.37 million units sold. During the 2011 holiday season, the Nintendo 3DS sold approximately 1.6 million units in Japan. By the end of 2011, Nintendo 3DS sales reached 4 million units sold in the United States. Overall, Nintendo sold 11.4 million Nintendo 3DS units worldwide, in 2011.

Subsequent sales 
On September 30, 2013, Nintendo president Satoru Iwata announced that the Nintendo 3DS had sold more than 5 million units in Japan during the year of 2013. This mark was only surpassed by its predecessor, the Nintendo DS.

Following the launch of the Nintendo 2DS, Nintendo sold 452,000 units of the Nintendo 3DS family in the United States, during the month of October, double the previous month's sales. As such, it achieved its sixth consecutive month as the best-selling video game console in the US. Total Nintendo 3DS first-party software sales for the month hit more than 2 million units, the highest since December 2011. North American retailer Target reported that the Nintendo 3DS XL was among its top-sellers during the Black Friday. On November 29, 2013, Nintendo of France deputy general manager Philippe Lavoué announced that Nintendo 3DS life-to-date hardware sales stand at 2.15 million units in France, in which 30 percent account for Nintendo 2DS sales. It was also announced that the 3DS possesses a market share of 50 percent of all video game systems sold, and that Nintendo 3DS software sales rose from 850,000 to 1,700,000 year-over-year in the region. According to the NPD Group, Nintendo sold around 770,000 units of the Nintendo 3DS family in November in North America, pushing the lifetime to nearly 10.5 million units in the region. On December 19, 2013, MCV reported that lifetime Nintendo 3DS family sales in the United Kingdom had hit 2 million units, making it the best-selling console of the year in the region.

By January 2014, Nintendo had sold 900,000 units in Spain. The fourth quarter of 2014 saw the release of the New Nintendo 3DS in Japan and Australia. Although having upgraded hardware, a few exclusive titles, and being capable of running Super NES games for the Virtual Console, it is not treated as a new generation of console. It is considered to be part of the 3DS family, and is therefore included in these sales figures.

The first quarter of 2015 saw the release of the New Nintendo 3DS, part of the 3DS family and thus counted among these sales figures, in Europe and North America.

, Nintendo reports 75.94 million units have been shipped worldwide, of which 25.26 million were shipped to Japan, 26.90 million were shipped to the Americas, and 23.78 million were shipped to other territories including Europe.

Health concerns 

Nintendo has publicly stated that the 3D mode of the Nintendo 3DS is not intended for use by children ages six and younger, citing possible harm to their vision. Nintendo suggests that younger players use the device's 2D mode instead, although the American Optometric Association has assured parents that 3D gaming in moderation would not be harmful for children. Additionally, the 3DS may help in screening children before the age of 6 who have depth related vision problems according to Dr. Michael Duenas, associate director for health sciences and policy for the American Optometric Association, and Dr. Joe Ellis, the president of the optometrists' association. However, Dr. David Hunter, a pediatric ophthalmologist affiliated with the American Academy of Ophthalmology believes that it is largely speculative whether a child who has problems perceiving depth in real life would react to a 3DS in any way that parents would recognize as indicating any problems with depth perception. Duenas asserted that Nintendo's vague warning that "there is a possibility that 3-D images which send different images to the left and right eye could affect the development of vision in small children," was not specifically backed up by any scientific evidence, and that it was motivated by preventing possible liability rather than safeguarding against realistic harm.

The system's parental controls, safeguarded by a PIN, allow parents to disable autostereoscopic effects on systems intended for use by young children. Playing games in 3D has been suspected of causing headaches among some gamers.

Nintendo of America president Reggie Fils-Aimé partially cited these concerns as one of the influences of the creation of the Nintendo 2DS, an entry-level version of the Nintendo 3DS systems lacking 3D functionality.

Legal issues 
In 2011, 58-year-old former Sony employee Seijiro Tomita sued Nintendo for infringing a patent on the 3D screen that obviates the need for 3D glasses. On March 13, 2013, a United States federal jury ordered Nintendo to pay him US$30.2 million in damages. However, on August 7, 2013, that amount was reduced by 50% to US$15.1 million because the initial figure was, according to Judge Jed Rakoff, a federal judge, "intrinsically excessive" and "unsupported by the evidence presented at trial." On December 11, 2013, it was decided by Judge Rakoff that Nintendo pay 1.82% of the wholesale price of each unit sold to Tomita. On March 17, 2018, the United States Appeals Court determined Nintendo had not violated Tomita's patent.

On July 17, 2015, Nintendo won a patent suit filed against eight of its handheld consoles, including the 3DS. The suit was originally filed by the Quintal Research Group after it secured a patent for a "computerized information retrieval system" in 2008.

See also 
 Citra, a Nintendo 3DS emulator

Notes

References

External links 

 Official Nintendo 3DS website 
 Official North American Nintendo 3DS website  
 Official European Nintendo 3DS website 
 Official Australian Nintendo 3DS website 

 
2010s toys
Backward-compatible video game consoles
Eighth-generation video game consoles
Handheld game consoles
IQue consoles
Discontinued handheld game consoles
Products introduced in 2011
Products and services discontinued in 2020